The first railway in colonial South Australia was a line from the port of Goolwa on the River Murray to an ocean harbour at Port Elliot, which first operated in December 1853, before its completion in May 1854. 

Today the state has  broad gauge suburban railways in Adelaide, a number of country freight lines, and key  standard gauge links to other states.

Gauge
South Australia was the first state to do so. In 1848 the Colonial Secretary in London, Lord Grey, recommended the Australian colonies all adopt standard gauge. However, this advice did not prevail.

The main line to Melbourne was opened after a bridge was built at Murray Bridge in 1886. It was the first railway line between colony capitals not to have a break-of-gauge, but it was to be 109 years before it was converted to standard gauge in 1995 – the last inter-capital line to be converted.

Narrow gauge
Influenced by Queensland Railway's successful adoption of the narrow gauge for cost reasons (opened 1865), and influenced by the advocacy of people such as Abraham Fitzgibbon South Australia changed the gauge of the Port Wakefield line in the middle of construction.  The Port Wakefield line, opened 1870, was originally horse drawn.

Because the narrow gauge lines of  started out as isolated lines from independent ports at Port Wakefield, Port Pirie, Port Augusta, Port Lincoln, Port Broughton, Beachport, Kingston SE and Wallaroo, and a private tramway from Whyalla, the problems of the nascent break of gauge was not immediately apparent.  When the broad and narrow systems finally met at Hamley Bridge, Terowie, Wolseley and Mount Gambier endless complaints started.  There may have been even more breaks of gauge, as the original bridge at Murray Bridge was designed for narrow gauge.

The horse-drawn narrow gauge Port Broughton railway line on the Yorke Peninsula was never connected to the main system.

The lines on the Eyre Peninsula Railway and throughout the mid-north were built to  narrow gauge.  Once the narrow gauge from Port Pirie to Broken Hill was converted to standard gauge, the narrow gauge from Terowie was converted to broad gauge to Peterborough. Peterborough became the change of gauge station for Broken Hill Adelaide express. The narrow gauge line was retained north from Peterborough to Quorn.

The main interstate links from Adelaide to Perth, Darwin, Melbourne, and Sydney are all of  standard gauge.

Operators
The country railways were initially owned by South Australian Railways. The narrow gauge lines north and west of Quorn were handed over to the Commonwealth Railways in 1926, though the Commonwealth had had financial responsibility for these lines since 1911. The Commonwealth Railways later merged with the SAR to become the Australian National Railways Commission (ANR) in 1978.

The metropolitan railway lines are now owned and operated by Adelaide Metro, interstate passenger services operated by Journey Beyond, intrastate freight by One Rail Australia, and interstate freight by a number of companies including Bowmans Rail, One Rail Australia, Pacific National and SCT Logistics.

Passenger services

Passenger services in South Australia have declined since the days of the South Australian Railways, today the only services are the Adelaide Metro suburban services; and the Journey Beyond operated The Overland between Adelaide and Melbourne, the Indian Pacific between Perth and Sydney via Adelaide, and The Ghan from Adelaide to Darwin, via Alice Springs. No country passenger rail services have operated in South Australia since 1990.

Railway preservation
Port Adelaide is home to the National Railway Museum, the largest undercover railway museum in Australia. The SteamRanger Heritage Railway in the Adelaide Hills has restored a number of steam and diesel locomotives for tourist services on the Victor Harbor railway line, operating between Mount Barker and Victor Harbor. The Pichi Richi Railway Preservation Society based in Quorn operates on part of the former Central Australia Railway. The Steamtown Heritage Rail Centre is a static railway museum based in the former railway workshops in Peterborough.

Other heritage operations have included the Lions Club of YP Rail (Wallaroo–Kadina), Limestone Coast Railway (on the Mount Gambier railway line from Mount Gambier railway station), Cobdogla Steam Friends, Steamtown Peterborough Railway Preservation Society (Peterborough–Eurelia) and the Australian Society of Section Car Operators (accreditation in SA surrendered in 2010).

History
The first railway in colonial South Australia was the horse-drawn tramway from Goolwa to Port Elliot opened in 1854, providing a rail link from the port of Goolwa on the Murray River to an ocean harbour at Port Elliot. It was later extended to a safer harbour at Victor Harbor. This line was used to move freight between the shallow-draft vessels navigating the Murray, and coastal and ocean-going vessels, without either having to traverse the narrow and shallow mouth of the river with unpredictable currents.

The first of the Railways in Adelaide was built in 1856 between the city and the port. Gradually, a network of lines spread out from Adelaide. These were initially built to carry ore, particularly copper, then later freight from the Murray River, and grain from the broadacre lands. In the first half of the 20th century, most of these lines carried passengers as well as freight.

The main line to Melbourne was opened after a bridge was built at Murray Bridge in 1886. It was the first railway line between colony capitals to not have a break-of-gauge. It was also the last of these to be converted to standard gauge in 1995.

Timeline
1854: Horsedrawn tram from Goolwa to Port Elliot
1856: First broad gauge line from Adelaide to Port Adelaide opens
1857: Adelaide–Gawler opened
1860: Gawler line extended through Roseworthy to Kapunda
1862: Private broad gauge horse-drawn tramway between Wallaroo and Kadina
1864: Horsedrawn tram extended to Victor Harbor
1866: Wallaroo line extended to Moonta
1869: First narrow gauge line opens from Port Wakefield through Balaklava to Hoyleton – isolated from broad gauge system. Originally horse-drawn railway
1870: Roseworthy junction created, with line through Hamley Bridge and Riverton to Burra, South Australia
1876: Narrow gauge line from Kingston SE to Naracoorte
1876: Port Broughton railway line between Port Broughton and Mundoora
1877: Wallaroo lines acquired by South Australian Railways
1878: Port Wakefield to Kadina narrow gauge opened and continued to Wallaroo adjacent to the broad gauge line.
1878: Narrow gauge branch from Balaklava to Hamley Bridge, creating the state's first break of gauge
1878: Kapunda line extended to the Murray River at Morgan
1879: Kadina junction to Snowtown opened
1879: Narrow gauge between Beachport, Millicent and Mount Gambier
1879: Narrow gauge line from Port Augusta reaches Quorn.
1880: Broad gauge lines reach Terowie and Gladstone
1881–1882: Narrow gauge built from Peterborough south to Terowie and north through Orroroo to Quorn
1883: South Line reaches Nairne through the Adelaide Hills
1883: Great Northern Line extended from Quorn to Hergott Springs (Marree)
1884: South Line reaches Murray Bridge
1884: Victor Harbor tramway strengthened to carry steam trains and extended to meet the South Line at Mount Barker Junction. A branch was also built from Sandergrove to Milang.
1886: Branch from Monarto on the South Line to Cambrai
1887: Railways of South Australia and Victoria meet at Serviceton
1887: Narrow gauge Mount Gambier to Naracoorte and Wolseley creating break-of-gauge junction at Wolseley on the Melbourne line
1888: Narrow gauge line built from Port Pirie to Broken Hill, New South Wales
1891: Great Northern Railway extended from Hergott Springs to Orroroo
1894: Snowtown branch extended to Brinkworth joining the Hamley Bridge-Gladstone railway line
1906: Pinnaroo railway line opened
1907: The first stage of Eyre Peninsula Railway opened from Port Lincoln to Cummins
1908: Port Adelaide line extended to Outer Harbor
1911: Gawler junction created, with Barossa line to Angaston
1913: Paringa railway line opened through Karoonda and Alawoona to the Brown's Well district near the state border, then extended north to Paringa by the end of the year
1914: Loxton railway line opened from Alawoona
1914: Waikerie railway line opened from Karoonda
1914: Peebinga railway line opened from Karoonda
1915: Willunga railway line completed
1917: First standard gauge line completed between Port Augusta and Kalgoorlie, Western Australia, requiring a break-of-gauge at Terowie, Port Augusta and Kalgoorlie to reach Perth
1917: broad gauge from Mount Gambier to Heywood near Portland in Victoria
1918: Branch from Balhannah on the Melbourne line to Mount Pleasant
1919: Railways of South Australia and New South Wales meet at ,Broken Hill with a break-of-gauge
1919: Branch from Riverton to Clare
1919: Sedan railway line opened from Monarto South
1922: Clare line extended to Spalding
1925: Moorook railway line opened from Wanbi on the Paringa line
1925: Junction at Salisbury on the Gawler line to Redhill
1927: Yorke Peninsula lines converted from narrow to broad gauge to connect to the line from Salisbury, along with the Hamley Bridge-Gladstone line
1928: Paringa railway line extended over the Murray River to Renmark, Berri and Barmera
1929: Great Northern Line extended to Alice Springs and renamed to Central Australia Railway
1937: Trans-Australian Railway extended to Port Pirie Junction and the broad gauge railway from Adelaide to Redhill extended to Port Pirie Ellen Street
1950s: Southeastern narrow gauge lines converted to broad gauge, except that Beachport–Millicent and Wandilo–Glencoe were closed in 1957
1957: Standard gauge Marree railway line replaced the narrow gauge line on a route west of the Flinders Ranges
1969: Willunga railway line closed from Hallett Cove 
1970: Port Pirie to Broken Hill standard gauge line officially opened, completing the Sydney – Perth rail link, and creating triple-gauge stations at Gladstone and Peterborough (once Terowie–Peterborough was converted from narrow to broad gauge)
1971: Moorook railway line closed
1970s: Southeastern lines closed or abandoned
1972: Whyalla railway line opened from Port Augusta (standard gauge)
1978: Noarlunga Centre railway line extended from Hallett Cove
1980: Tarcoola to Alice Springs standard gauge railway opened, first stage of the Tarcoola-Darwin line
1982: Adelaide to Crystal Brook standard gauge railway opened to replace broad gauge from Salisbury to Port Pirie, connecting Adelaide to the standard gauge network 
 1987: Kingston–Naracoorte closed
1990: Waikerie and Peebinga lines closed
1995: Adelaide to Melbourne gauge converted from broad gauge to standard gauge under the Federal Government's One Nation project (isolated broad gauge southeastern lines stopped being used)
1998 Pinnaroo and Loxton lines converted to standard gauge to reconnect at Tailem Bend
2008: State Government announces budget which includes plans to electrify the Noarlunga, Outer Harbor and Gawler lines
2014: Noarlunga Centre line extended to Seaford and electric trains commence service along the Seaford and Tonsley lines
2015: Pinnaroo and Loxton lines mothballed
2019: Eyre Peninsula Railway line closed

The first South Australian steam-operated line was built as a broad gauge line in 1856 between the city and Port Adelaide stopping at Bowden, Woodville and Alberton. This line is now part of the Adelaide suburban network and has been proposed for standardisation and conversion to light rail.   It was extended as the Outer Harbor line to Outer Harbor in 1908. A branch was built to Grange in 1882. It was extended as the Henley Beach line to Henley Beach in 1894 and closed in 1957.

Development of the lines

Southern Lines
The South Line, through the Adelaide Hills, was opened to Aldgate, Nairne in 1883, Murray Bridge in 1884 and Bordertown and Serviceton, Victoria, connecting with Victorian Railways in 1887. This line was standardised in 1995.

A branch line was built to Marino in 1913, and extended to Willunga in 1915. The section from Hallett Cove to Willunga was closed in 1969. In the 1970s the line was extended south from Hallett Cove, becoming what is now the Adelaide Metro Seaford railway line. It reached Christie Downs in 1976, Noarlunga Centre in 1978, with a further extension to Seaford in 2014.

The beginnings of the Victor Harbor line was a horse-drawn broad gauge tramway built from the port of Goolwa on the Murray River to an ocean harbour at Port Elliot in 1854. This line was used to move freight between the shallow-draft vessels navigating the Murray, and coastal and ocean-going vessels, without either having to traverse the narrow and shallow mouth of the river with unpredictable currents. It was later extended from Port Elliot to Victor Harbor in 1864 and from Goolwa to Strathalbyn in 1869. It was extended to Mount Barker Junction on the South Line in 1884 and strengthened to carry steam trains.

A branch from the South Line between the Mount Lofty Ranges and Murray River was built to Monarto and Cambrai in 1886. It was shortened to Apamurra near Palmer before being converted then closed briefly due to the standardisation of the Adelaide – Melbourne line in 1995. The line was then converted to standard gauge later in 1995 until it then closed again in 2005. 

In the Murray Mallee, the Pinnaroo line was built from Tailem Bend to Pinnaroo in 1906. This was connected with the Victorian Railways at the Victorian border and Ouyen by 1915. The South Australian part of this line was converted to standard gauge in 1998 to reconnect it with the Adelaide – Melbourne line. This created a break-of-gauge at Pinnaroo. The last traffic on the line was transporting grain from silos to Port Adelaide. Viterra announced that no more grain would be carried by rail on this line after 31 July 2015, with the 2015 harvest to be entirely transported by road.

The Barmera railway line opened from Tailem Bend through Karoonda to Wanbi on 6 January 1913, extended to Paruna on 1 May and Meribah on 7 May 1913 (both in the Brown's Well district). Even while this line was still being built, the Government of South Australia approved several spur lines from it to open up over a million acres of farmland. These were:
 Waikerie railway line Karoonda north to Waikerie (opened December 1914)closed 14 March 1990 to Galga, 4 March 1994 to Karoonda
Alawoona north to Loxton (opened February 1914) closed 2015
 Brown's Well north to Paringa (opened October 1913), closed to Alawoona December 1990 then Tailem Bend August 2015
 The Peebinga railway line east from Karoonda covering the gap between the Pinnaroo and Brown's Well lines, opened 18 December 1914, closed 7 December 1990.
The government expected these lines to not recover the cost in the short term, but to open up land for farming wheat to "strengthen the backbone of South Australia". They were built using second-hand rails, and were the first in the state to use steel sleepers.

Later, the Moorook railway line was opened from Wanbi to Yinkanie (near Moorook) in September 1925, but closed in 1971.
In 1928 the line was opened from Paringa to Renmark and Barmera; it closed in 1990.

The last of these lines was the Loxton railway line which was converted to standard gauge in 1998. It closed with the transfer of the grain traffic to road after July 2015. Viterra announced that no more grain would be carried by rail in the region after 31 July 2015, with the 2015 harvest to be entirely transported by road.

Southern narrow gauge lines

In 1876 a narrow  gauge line known as the Kingston-Naracoorte railway line was built from Kingston SE to Naracoorte. In 1879, a railway was built between Beachport, Millicent and Mount Gambier. In 1887 they were linked by a line from Mount Gambier to Naracoorte and Wolseley on the broad gauge Melbourne–Adelaide railway, creating a break-of-gauge junction at Wolseley. It later had a branch line added from Wandilo to Glencoe.

The Mount Gambier-Heywood railway line, a broad gauge line, was opened between Mount Gambier and Heywood near Portland in 1917. From 1953 to 1956, the southeastern lines were converted to broad gauge, with the exception of the Beachport – Millicent and the Wandilo – Glencoe line, which were closed down in 1957. The Kingston – Naracoorte was closed on 28 November 1987. The other southeastern lines, including the line to Heywood, have been out of use since the standardisation of the Adelaide – Melbourne and Maroona – Portland lines on 12 April 1995. There are regular calls for their standardisation.

Northern lines

Broad gauge lines
In 1857 the  Gawler line was built to Gawler station, which was rural at the time, and extended to Roseworthy, Kapunda in 1860. The main line left the Kapunda branch at Roseworthy and proceeded to Hamley Bridge, Riverton, Burra in 1870. The Kapunda branch was extended to Morgan in 1878. The Burra line was extended to Terowie in 1880.

The Barossa Valley railway line was built from Gawler Junction, north of Gawler station, through what is now Gawler Central station, to Nuriootpa and Angaston in the Barossa Valley in 1911. A further branch was constructed from Nuriootpa to Stockwell and Truro. The Penrice branch to the quarry from near Stockwell was the last destination to operate beyond Gawler Central.

A branch line was built from Riverton to Clare in 1919 and Spalding in 1922. This line was lifted in the early 80s and parts of it have been restored as the Rattler Trail (Riverton to Auburn) and Riesling Trail (Auburn to Clare), a bicycle and walking trail through the Clare Valley.

In 1925, a broad gauge line was built from Salisbury to Redhill and in 1937, it was extended to Port Pirie to meet the extension of the standard gauge from Port Augusta. This line was converted to standard gauge in 1982, including a deviation at the northern end to move the rail junction from Port Pirie to Crystal Brook.

Western Division narrow gauge lines
The lines in the Mid North (generally north of Goyder's Line, which is the limit of 10" annual rainfall) were built to narrow gauge .

Upper Yorke Peninsula lines

The first narrow gauge line ran from Port Wakefield to Hoyleton, opened in 1870 and branched from Balaklava to Hamley Bridge in 1878, creating Australia's first break-of-gauge on the government railways.

A horse-drawn tramway was built by the Kadina and Wallaroo Railway and Pier Company between Wallaroo and Kadina in 1862 and extended to Moonta in 1866. This was acquired by the South Australian Railways in 1877 and a new narrow gauge line was built along its route and connected to Port Wakefield in about 1878. A line was built from Brinkworth to Snowtown, Bute and Kadina in 1879. These lines were converted to broad gauge in 1927. 
All the lines west of the Adelaide–Crystal Brook standard gauge line and the line from Snowtown to Brinkworth were closed after the Adelaide – Crystal Brook line was opened in 1982, despite proposals to convert some of them to standard gauge.

There are calls to convert the Wolseley to Mount Gambier line to standard gauge. This partly reflects the lifting of restriction on the road transportation of grain Australia-wide that followed recommendations of the 1986-88 Royal Commission into grain storage, handling and transport. This particularly affected South Australian railways because of the short distances between the growing areas and its various wheat exporting ports. The Snowtown to Wallaroo Broad Gauge was converted to Dual Gauge (Standard/Broad) during the late 1980s.

North Mount Lofty Ranges lines
A line was built from Balaklava to Brinkworth and Gladstone by 1880 and later extended to Wilmington. The Hamley Bridge – Balaklava – Brinkworth – Gladstone line was converted to broad gauge in 1927, making Gladstone a break-of-gauge junction. In 1969, when the line from Port Pirie to Broken Hill was converted to standard gauge, Gladstone became a three-gauge break-of-gauge junction (together with Peterborough and succeeding Port Pirie, which had been reduced to two gauges). In the 1980s, the broad gauge line north of Balaklava and the narrow gauge line were closed, leaving Gladstone as a purely standard gauge station.

A narrow gauge line was built from Terowie to Peterborough in 1881, creating a break-of-gauge at Terowie, although the enforced train change created an opportunity for General Douglas MacArthur to deliver his famous line "I shall return" at Terowie station on 20 March 1942. The break-of-gauge was not overcome until the Terowie – Peterborough line was converted to broad gauge in 1970, to meet new the standard gauge from Port Pirie to Broken Hill, but it was abandoned by 1988.

The narrow gauge line was extended to Orroroo also in 1881 and Quorn in 1882, connecting with the new line from Port Augusta. This line has now been abandoned.

A narrow gauge railway was built from Port Pirie to Gladstone, Peterborough and Broken Hill, in 1888 to serve the Broken Hill silver and lead mine, which was becoming the largest and richest of its kind in the world. Since the New South Wales Government would not allow the South Australia railway to cross the border, the last  was built by a private company as a tramway, the Silverton Tramway from Cockburn to Silverton and Broken Hill. In 1970 the line was converted to standard gauge, completing the standard transcontinental gauge line from Sydney to Perth.

The Great Northern Railway
The Great Northern Railway was completed from Port Augusta across the Pichi Richi Pass to Quorn in 1879, Hergott Springs (now known as Marree) in 1883 and Oodnadatta in 1891. It was extended to Alice Springs by the Commonwealth Railways in 1929, when it was renamed the Central Australia Railway.

In 1957, the new standard gauge line was built from Stirling North (near Port Augusta) to Marree on a new alignment west of the Flinders Ranges and the narrow gauge line between Hawker and Marree was abandoned. The remainder of the narrow gauge line between Stirling North, Quorn and Hawker was abandoned in 1972, although the Stirling North – Quorn section has been taken over by the Pichi Richi tourist railway (with a more recent extension into the town of Port Augusta completed in 2001). The narrow gauge line from Marree to Alice Springs was abandoned with the opening of the new standard gauge railway from Tarcoola to Alice Springs in 1980. The standard gauge line from Stirling North has since been abandoned north of the Leigh Creek Coalfield.

Eyre Peninsula lines 
The isolated SAR Port Lincoln Division was built to  narrow gauge, all of it lightly built since its purpose was to promote agricultural development of the area. Construction started with a railway between Port Lincoln and Cummins, opened in 1907. It was vitally important in its early days since roads were few and unmade; communities throughout the Eyre Peninsula relied totally on the SAR for transport of their produce to port, supplies for their everyday needs, and passenger transport. As roads improved, however, "roadside goods" traffic declined, usually to one train a week, and passenger services ceased in 1968.
Meanwhile, from the mid-1960s, a transition took place from bagged grain traffic in open wagons to bulk grain hopper wagons in point-to-point unit trains, vastly improving efficiency. The system ended in 2019 when grain distributor Viterra moved to road haulage.

The steel industry company, BHP, developed two separate systems on the peninsula. It conveyed mineral sand  from Coffin Bay to Proper Bay on the outskirts of Port Lincoln.

Northern Territory railway

The Northern Territory was part of South Australia from 1863 to 1911, when it was transferred to Commonwealth control.

The Palmerston and Pine Creek Railway was a narrow gauge  railway and ran from Darwin, once known as Palmerston, to Pine Creek.

The John Cox Bray Government in South Australia introduced the Palmerston and Pine Creek Railway Bill in 1883. The £959,300 contract went to C & E Millar of Melbourne on the proviso that they could use Asian labourers. The line reached Pine Creek in 1888 and was officially opened on 30 September 1889. A total of 310 bridges and flood openings were built.

The Commonwealth Government took over the line in 1911 and renamed it the Northern Territory Railway. The line was extended to Katherine in 1917. Further extensions in the 1920s saw it eventually reach Birdum, just south of Larrimah, in 1929, when it was further renamed the North Australia Railway, to distinguish it from the Central Australia Railway, which reached Alice Springs from the south in the same year.

Although a railway line from Alice Springs to Darwin had been discussed for many years, the North 
Australia Railway was closed in 1976. However eventually the standard gauge Adelaide to Darwin Railway was finally completed on 17 September 2003 with the line between Alice Springs and Darwin. The first freight train reached Darwin on 17 January 2004.

Adelaide suburban network
Adelaide's metropolitan rail network was the last of Australia's five major cities to be electrified. Almost $500 million in funding has been provided in the 2008-09 State Budget for electrification and gauge conversion.

However, not all lines have finished electrification, and at this stage, the Belair line will not be electrified.

In Adelaide, concrete sleepers, installed since the 1990s are of a slightly more expensive gauge convertible type to facilitate the conversion.

List of country railways in South Australia

Mid North
Morgan railway line: Adelaide – Kapunda (1860), extended to Morgan in 1878, with junctions at Gawler and Roseworthy (now closed and dismantled beyond Kapunda)
Port Wakefield railway line: Port Wakefield –  Balaklava – Hoyleton (opened 1870, closed and dismantled)
Port Broughton railway line: Port Broughton – Mundoora (1876) was horse-drawn uphill, and gravity-powered to carry bagged wheat down to the port
Peterborough railway line: Roseworthy – Burra (1870), later extended to Terowie (1880), then Peterborough, with junctions at Hamley Bridge and Riverton (now closed and dismantled beyond Burra)
Gladstone railway line: Hamley Bridge – Balaklava, continuing through Brinkworth to Gladstone (now closed and dismantled beyond Balaklava)
Port Wakefield–Moonta railway line: Port Wakefield – Kadina – Wallaroo – Moonta (1862 horse-drawn between Wallaroo and Kadina, 1878 to Port Wakefield, now closed)
Brinkworth–Kadina railway line: Brinkworth – Snowtown – Bute – Kadina (1879, now closed)
Barossa Valley railway line: Gawler to Penrice and Angaston in the Barossa Valley, the Penrice Stone Train carried limestone from a quarry at Penrice to soda works at Osborne, near Port Adelaide until June 2014 – (now mothballed)
Spalding railway line: Riverton to Clare and Spalding – closed, the easement is now used for the Riesling and Rattler rail trails through the lower Mid North and Clare Valley
Adelaide-Port Augusta railway line (part): Adelaide – Port Pirie

Branches from the Melbourne line
Mount Pleasant line (1918): Balhannah to Mount Pleasant via Oakbank, Woodside, Mount Torrens and Birdwood. Closed 1963 (tracks have since been totally removed)
Victor Harbor line: Mount Barker to Goolwa and Victor Harbor
Milang line (1884–1968): Sandergrove to Milang via Nurragi. A 13 kilometre spur line opened in 1884 and closed in 1970 (line dismantled)
Sedan line (1919): Monarto South north to Sedan (shortened to Apamurra before being closed). The rails from that section were reused in 2001 by the Pichi Richi Railway to extend their narrow gauge track from Stirling North to Port Augusta
Pinnaroo line (1907): Tailem Bend (south east of Murray Bridge) to Pinnaroo continuing into Victoria to Ouyen (mothballed in 2015)
Barmera railway line (1913): Tailem Bend – Karoonda – Meribah with later extensions to Paringa (Oct 1913), Renmark and Barmera(closed and dismantled)
Waikerie line: Karoonda to Waikerie (closed and dismantled)
Moorook line: Wanbi – Yinkanie (near Moorook) (Closed and dismantled)
Loxton line: Alawoona – Loxton (mothballed in 2015)
Peebinga line: Karoonda – Peebinga (near the state border between the Brown's Well district and Pinnaroo)
Mount Gambier line: Wolseley (between Bordertown and the state border) through Naracoorte to Mount Gamber. (closed pending standard gauge conversion)
Naracoorte – Kingston SE opened 1877, now closed and dismantled.                                                  
Wandilo – Glencoe opened 1904, now closed and dismantled.                    **Mount Gambier – Beachport to the west via Tantanoola and Millicent. Opened 1878, now closed and dismantled from Adelaide Road, Millicent to Beachport.
Mount Gambier – Heywood to the east, linking into the Victorian network, near Portland. (closed pending standard gauge conversion)

North
Port Pirie – Broken Hill (in stages from 1875, completed 1888, standard gauge since 1970)
Central Australia Railway: Port Augusta – Quorn (1879) – Marree (1883) – Oodnadatta (1891) – Alice Springs (1929) (narrow gauge) – closed in 1980
Peterborough–Quorn railway line: Peterborough – Port Augusta via Orroroo and Quorn (1881)
Port Pirie – Port Augusta (1937)
Stirling North to Marree line (standard gauge) (1957) replaced the narrow gauge line to Marree. Used to haul coal from Leigh Creek to power stations at Port Augusta until 2016.
Trans-Australian Railway: Port Augusta – Kalgoorlie, Western Australia – the first standard gauge line, built in 1917
Port Augusta to Whyalla line (1972) standard gauge
Tarcoola-Alice Springs line: Tarcoola – Alice Springs (1980)

Eyre Peninsula
One Rail Australia (ORA) own the Eyre Peninsula Railway lines
Port Lincoln – Thevenard (west of Ceduna) with junctions at Cummins and Yeelanna.
 Thevenard to Penong (Via Kevin) (Kevin – Penong Surrendered to the Minister for Transport.no longer serviceable)
Cummins – Buckleboo (north of Kimba) (Kimba – Buckleboo Dormant)
Yeelanna – Kapinnie (Dormant)

ORA manage the BHP Whyalla Tramway
Whyalla – Iron Knob (private – owned by Arrium) – narrow gauge, opened 1901, carries iron ore
Whyalla (109 km) – Iron Baron (private – owned by Liberty House Group) opened 1930, extended to Iron Duke in 1990

BHP owned the Coffin Bay Tramway
 Proper Bay (near Port Lincoln) to Coffin Bay to carry lime sand between 1960 and 1989

See also
Andrews FB. The Salisbury munitions tramways. In "Light railways", 187. February 2006.
Anon. The bay line. SASTA, Adelaide. 1979
Callaghan WH. The Overland Railway. Australian Railway Historical Society NSW Div., St James. 1992.
Callaghan WH. Railways Rather than Roads Australian Railway History September 2006 et seq
Castle BJ. The Balhannah – Mount Pleasant branch line. Australian Railway Historical Society Bulletin 316, February 1964.
Collins N. The jetties of South Australia. Privately published, Woodside. 2005.
 Evans, John The Uniform Gauge Question: A South Australian Perspective Australian Railway History Vol.65 No.918, April 2014
Fluck RE, R Sampson and KJ Bird. Steam locomotives and railcars of the South Australian Railways. Mile End Railway Museum, Roseworthy. 1986.
Jennings R. Line clear: 100 years of train working Adelaide-Serviceton. Mile End Railway Museum, Roseworthy. 1986.
Lockyer A. Jetty and wharf tramways of South Australia. In "Light railways", 142. August 1998.
Mack D. Little coastal railways of the Adelaide plains. Privately published, Camden Park. 1986.
McNicol S. SAR railcars. Railmac, Elizabeth. 1989.
Pantlin G and J Sargent (eds). Railway stations in greater metropolitan Adelaide. Train Hobby, Melbourne. 2005.
Richardson J.(ed) Along the line no. 2. Traction Publications, Canberra City. 1964.
Richardson J.(ed) Along the line in South Australia. Traction Publications, Canberra City. 1964
Sampson R. Rails round Adelaide. Mile End Railway Museum, Walkerville. 1978.
Thompson MH. The Goodwood – Brighton – Willunga line. Australian Railway Historical Society Bulletin, 336, October 1965.
Wheaton RT. Rails to the bay. Australian Electric Traction Assoc. Sydney, 1971.

References

External links 
National Rail Museum – history of rail in South Australia
Peninsula Pioneer – history of the railways of Eyre Peninsula
Railpage Australia – discussion forums and news

Maps:
eastern SA map
western SA map
SA railway track and signalling

 
 
Transport in South Australia